A Let L-410 Turbolet crash occurred in Yirol, South Sudan, on 9 September 2018 en route from Juba International Airport to Yirol Airport. The Let L-410 Turbolet aircraft was carrying a total of 23 passengers and crew, of which 20 were killed on impact, including the Anglican Bishop of Yirol, Simon Adut Yuang. The small plane crashed into Lake Yirol amid heavy fog and poor visibility.

Aircraft history
The aircraft, registered UR-TWO, operated by Ukrainian carrier Slaver Kompani for South Sudan-based South West Aviation, had been delivered to Aeroflot in 1984, then transferred to various operators until 2006, when it was placed in storage in Rivne, Ukraine. In April 2018, the plane was acquired by Slaver Kompani and wet-leased since May.

See also
List of accidents and incidents involving the Let L-410 Turbolet

References

2018 in South Sudan
Accidents and incidents involving the Let L-410 Turbolet
Aviation accidents and incidents in 2018
Aviation accidents and incidents in South Sudan
Lakes (state)
September 2018 events in Africa